In mathematics, a stunted projective space is a construction on a projective space of importance in homotopy theory, introduced by . Part of a conventional projective space is collapsed down to a point.

More concretely, in a real projective space, complex projective space or quaternionic projective space

KPn,

where K stands for the real numbers, complex numbers or quaternions, one can find (in many ways) copies of

KPm,

where m < n. The corresponding stunted projective space is then

KPn,m = KPn/KPm,

where the notation implies that the KPm has been identified to a point. This makes a topological space that is no longer a manifold. The importance of this construction was realised when it was shown that real stunted projective spaces arose as Spanier–Whitehead duals of spaces of Ioan James, so-called quasi-projective spaces, constructed from Stiefel manifolds. Their properties were therefore linked to the construction of frame fields on spheres.

In this way the vector fields on spheres question was reduced to a question on stunted projective spaces: for RPn,m, is there a degree one mapping on the 'next cell up' (of the first dimension not collapsed in the 'stunting') that extends to the whole space? Frank Adams showed that this could not happen, completing the proof.

In later developments spaces KP∞,m and stunted lens spaces have also been used.

References

Homotopy theory
Differential topology